Óscar José Ricardo Maúrtua de Romaña (born 7 February 1947) is a Peruvian diplomat and jurist who served as Minister of Foreign Relations of Peru from August 2021 to February 2022, under the presidency of Pedro Castillo. He previously occupied the office under President Alejandro Toledo during the last of year of his presidency.

A career diplomat since 1968, Maúrtua served throughout his career as the Peruvian ambassador to many countries, such as Canada, Bolivia, Thailand, Vietnam, Laos, and Ecuador. He also served as Fernando Belaúnde's chief of staff during his second presidency (1980–1985).

Maúrtua serves as president of the Peruvian International Law Society since 2017.

Minister of Foreign Relations
Maúrtua was appointed by president Alejandro Toledo as Minister of Foreign Relations for the first time on 16 August 2005, following the resignation of Carlos Ferrero's cabinet five days earlier, which prompted newly inaugurated foreign minister, Fernando Olivera, a controversial politician, to resign. He served under Pedro Pablo Kuczynski's premiership until the end to Toledo's presidency.

Sixteen years later, Maúrtua would be called up to assume the ministry for a second time under Pedro Castillo's presidency and Guido Bellido's premiership, following Héctor Béjar's resignation amidst the political instability generated by the latter's unfortunate statements regarding the rise of terrorism in Peru, as he blamed the Peruvian Navy and the CIA on the matter. Maúrtua's appointment has been considered a reversal of Castillo's initial left-wing foreign policy initiated under Béjar, generating criticism from the governing Free Peru's hard-left representatives.

On 1 February 2022, Maúrtua was succeeded as minister by constitutionalist César Landa after President Pedro Castillo did not ratify him in his second cabinet reshuffle.

References

Peruvian diplomats
Ambassadors of Peru to Bolivia
Ambassadors of Peru to Canada
Ambassadors of Peru to Ecuador
Foreign ministers of Peru
1947 births
Living people